Alton Downs may refer to:

 Alton Downs, Queensland, a locality in the Rockhampton Region, Queensland, Australia
 Alton Downs Station, a pastoral property in South Australia